Achi may refer to:
Achi language, a Mayan language
Achi people, a Maya people in Guatemala

In places:
Achí, Bolívar a municipality in Colombia
Achi, Nagano, a village in Japan
Achi, Jalal-Abad, a village in Kyrgyzstan
Achi (Nigeria), a town in Enugu State, Nigeria
Achi, Ozurgeti Municipality, a village in Georgia
Achi Monastery, a medieval church near the village

In other uses:
Achi (game), an abstract strategy game
Australasian College of Health Informatics, a professional organisation
Australian Classification of Health Interventions, the system used to code inpatient episodes of care in Australian hospitals

People with the name
William Charles Achi (1858–1928), Hawaiian lawyer and politician
William Charles Achi, Jr. (1889–1947), Hawaiian attorney and territorial judge
Achi Brandt (born 1938), Israeli mathematician

See also
 Rabinal Achí, a Mayan theatrical play
Advanced Host Controller Interface (AHCI)